Charles Gregory Nelson (27 March 1953 – 2 February 2015) was an American computer scientist.

Biography 
Nelson grew up in Honolulu. As a boy he excelled at gymnastics and tennis. He attended the University Laboratory School. He received his B.A. degree in mathematics from Harvard University in 1976. He received his Ph.D. in computer science from Stanford University in 1980 under the supervision of Robert Tarjan. He lived in Juneau, Alaska for a year before settling permanently in the San Francisco Bay Area.

Notable work 
His thesis, Techniques for Program Verification, influenced both program verification and automated theorem proving, especially in the area now named satisfiability modulo theories, where he contributed techniques for combining decision procedures, as well as efficient decision procedures for quantifier-free constraints in first-order logic and term algebra. He received the Herbrand Award in 2013:

He was instrumental in developing the Simplify theorem prover used by ESC/Java. He made significant contributions in several other areas. He contributed to the field of programming language design as a member of the Modula-3 committee. In distributed systems he contributed to Network Objects. He made pioneering contributions with his constraint-based graphics editors (Juno and Juno-2), windowing system (Trestle), optimal code generation (Denali), and multi-threaded programming (Eraser).

See also 
List of computer scientists
List of programmers

References 

1953 births
2015 deaths
Harvard University alumni
Stanford University School of Engineering alumni
20th-century American scientists
21st-century American scientists
American computer scientists
American computer programmers
Programming language researchers
Programming language designers
Formal methods people
Scientists from Hawaii
Scientists at PARC (company)